Steve Moore is an American playwright born in Chicago, Illinois. He attended the University of Chicago where he majored in Classics, and received an MFA in Playwriting from the Michener Center for Writers at the University of Texas at Austin.

After graduating, he moved to Austin, Texas and, along with a few fellow theatre-savvy friends, created the Physical Plant Theatre Company. Since its beginnings, Moore has written the majority of the company's plays, receiving vast praise from Austin theatre and arts critics.

In 2006, his play Not Clown enjoyed an Off-Broadway run to positive reviews from The New York Times.

Stage plays 
 Plant Number One (1994) - An imagistic, highly choreographed comedy set in a Draconian office of the future. Inadvertently, one afternoon Employee #16 drops a staple that by morning has come to life and learned to type. The play tracks the staple's meteoric rise to power in the corporate world.
 Digi-glo (1994) - A single actor moves between three "spheres" onstage to recount a mysterious car trip to Seattle. In one sphere, a driver picks up a hitchhiker who is the incarnation of the driver's failed romantic relationship; in another, a lecturer postulates about that relationship's history and future; and in the third, a miniature clown version of the driver panics, rambles, and represents a variety of inner upheaval.
 Tiller (1995) - Two fates hang in swings above a doomed ship whose captain has steered it into a sea of dreams. The oarsmen pound out language like a heart pounding blood, as the navigator frets and sings. With this play we discovered a space between what is visible and invisible, possible and impossible, and the fates are seized and made to answer for the unearned ill-luck of the ship and her crew.
 barber, tallman, Cora, clown (1995) - In this joyfully obscure and bizarre mass-collaboration, the tallest man in the world goes for a haircut at a barber shop whose blue barbicide fluide serves as a portal to an invisible, unsteady circus world. An echo chamber of symbols and language as pure and complete as a dream.
 (once.) (1996) - Alfred's love of the playpus leads him toward and away from a gazebo (which is ever on fire), where he meets and falls in love with Agnes—who gathers up the fallen pieces of the sky in her wheelbarrow. In an old Hyde Park toolshed for seven weeks, never for more than fourteen people each night, and always for free, we performed this strange, quiet, lyrical play.
 The Whimsy (1998) - A puppet-and-human play with live music where the artifacts of dreams arrive in the pockets of the wide-awake, where hearts attached on the outside of the body, where the yard-bird spoke and the Moon sang. A love story in the middle of the sea.
 The Kindermann Depiction (2002) - From eight feet above the action, the audience observed characters who never spoke but sometimes sang, whose currencies were ice, blood, books, and grieving, and whose engine was the death of a nameless child.
 Not Clown (2004) - In a time when clowns are tortured and circuses banned, a renegade troupe enacts the story of a girl who longs for their outlawed life—even as her father commits atrocities on the State's behalf. Limbs rebel against the body. The cram car bolts for the border. And a round, red nose is a dark souvenir.
 Nightswim (2004) - Tells the story of Roy Bedichek, J. Frank Dobie and Walter Prescott Webb—the inspirations behind the Philosophers' Rock sculpture at Barton Springs. A naturalist, a storyteller and a historian, the trio once defined popular literature in Austin. Moore animates the friends at their beloved Barton Springs on the demise of Bedichek, who negotiates with a post-mortem gatekeeper ("X") to spend more time in the place he loved the most.
Kneeling Down At Noon (2006) - Physical Plant teams up with St. Edward's University to present this original play about Islam—or, more particularly, about the lives of a handful of Muslims struggling to find, share, and live their daily faith. From the devout wife of a Syrian atheist activist, to the doubting son struggling with prejudice in America, to the secret policeman twisting Islam to his own ends, each character is a lens onto this complex and much-maligned religion. But more than that, the play folds these characters into remarkable stories that undermine, amplify, and invigorate the ways they understand God—and the will of God on earth.
 Petite-Petite, or Bright Misgivings (2008) - A puppet show in which Paris reaches accidental perfection while the world beyond unravels. God and Voltaire share a flat and fight about the dishes. Teams of identical Hemingways play water polo in the Seine. Joan of Arc is giving up smoking. Baudelaire runs an opium den. And a wide-eyed walrus arrives in the middle of the night.

References

External links
Physical Plant Theatre Co. Website

American dramatists and playwrights
Writers from Chicago
Living people
University of Chicago alumni
Year of birth missing (living people)
Michener Center for Writers alumni